Collera is one of nine parishes (administrative divisions) in Ribadesella, a municipality within the province and autonomous community of Asturias, in northern Spain.

Villages
Camango (Camangu)
Collera
Cuerres
Meluerda
Toriello (Torriellu)
Oreyana

Parishes in Ribadesella